The South Carolina Gamecocks women's soccer team represents the University of South Carolina and competes in the Southeastern Conference.  The team was formed in 1995 and plays its home games at Stone Stadium.  Shelley Smith is the current head coach of the women's soccer team, with her husband, Jamie, serving as  associate head coach.  The Gamecocks have played in 15 NCAA Tournaments, posting 11 Round of 32 appearances, 7 Round of 16 appearances, five Quarterfinal appearances, and a College Cup berth in 2017.

Head coaches
Statistics correct as of the end of the 2016 NCAA Division I women's soccer season

Year-by-Year Results
Statistics correct as of the end of the 2016 NCAA Division I women's soccer season

Attendance

Over the past few seasons, the South Carolina Gamecocks have become one of the national leaders in attendance for Women's Soccer. Since 2014 the program ranks in the top three nationally in total and average attendance.

The current attendance record of 6,354 was set on August 24 in a 1–0 victory over Clemson.

References

External links

 
Soccer clubs in South Carolina
1995 establishments in South Carolina
NCAA Division I women's soccer teams
Association football clubs established in 1995